Nkusi Arthur (born 22 Jan 1991) commonly known as 'Rutura' is a Rwandan actor, radio presenter, comedian, choreographer, event manager and creative consultant. He is also the founder & Creative Director at Arthur Nation.

He is a former Big Brother Africa housemate, where he represented Rwanda alongside Frank Rukundo in the 9th season of the show. He is also one of the pioneers of standup comedy in Rwanda.

As a comedian, Nkusi has performed and shared stage with renown comedians like Nigeria's BasketMouth Bright Okpocha, Congo's Eddie Kadi, Kenya's MC Jessy, Uganda's Daniel Omara, Patrick Salvador, in some of the popular comedy shows such as: Comedy store Uganda, The Churchill Show, Comedy night, Seka Live, Africa Laughs.

Early life and career 
Arthur was in born in Uganda on 22 February 1969 to Mr. Mpazimpaka Kennedy and Mrs. Kibuuka. Nkusi went to La Colombiere primary school and had his secondary education at Lycee de Kigali before enrolling at the University of Rwanda for an advanced diploma in Agriculture. Nkusi is currently pursuing a Master's in Global Digital Marketing at the University of Essex.

Comedy 
In 2004,Arthur's career begun when he joined Masharika performing Arts, comedy, music, and choreography.

Filmography 
At the age of 14, Arthur Nkusi was featured in a movie titled Beyond the Gates, a film directed by Michael Caton-Jones. which paved him a way that led him into appearing in other movies like Shake Hands With the Devil ,Volunteers,The Missing Pillar films,The city dropout.

Broadcasting 
Arthur's radio presenting career begun in 2012, when right the Nation Media Group announced a spot at Kfm radio, and he got a job to lead the evening drive show called “Rush Hour with the Double A”. He worked until 2015, before joining Kiss Fm, where he worked for seven years before retiring from the radio broadcasting to join the creative industry .

Personal life 
Nkusi Arthur is married to Muthoni Fiona who is a producer and presenter at CNBC Africa.

See also 

 Comedy Store Uganda
 14th Africa Movie Academy Awards
 Big Brother Africa (season 9)
 List of Africa Movie Academy Awards ceremonies

External links 

 Images & paix: les Rwandais et les Burundais face à cinéma et à l'audiovisuel : une histoire politico-culturelle du Rwanda-Urundi allemand et belge et des Républiques du Rwanda et du Burundi (1896-2008)
 Stand-up comedy in Africa 
 Arthur Nkusi

References  

Living people
African comedians
Rwandan male actors
Rwandan journalists
1991 births